Southern High School is a high school located in Harwood, Maryland, U.S., in Anne Arundel County. The school is operated by Anne Arundel County Public Schools. Southern was recognized as a Blue Ribbon School in 2009.  They recently won the 2A State Lacrosse Championship 20–7, tying the record for most goals scored in a state championship game in Maryland state history. Also known as a great unified sports program which seeks participation and inclusion of every one.

Academics and rankings

Southern High School is one of two public high schools in Anne Arundel County to earn both a National and Maryland Blue Ribbon Award, the other being Severna Park High School.

In 2019, US News ranked Southern High School among the top 25 high schools in the Baltimore metro area, which included a ranking of public high schools in Anne Arundel County, Baltimore, Baltimore County, Carroll County, Howard County, Harford County, and Queen Anne's County.

Southern High School offers 26 AP courses, exceeding the state average of 18 and the county average of 25.

Notable alumni
 Phillip D. Bissett, former member of Maryland House of Delegates
 Dale Castro, former football player and coach
 Brothers Osborne, Country Music Award-winning duo. Brothers John and TJ graduated in 2000 and 2002 respectively.

References

External links
Official website
The Southern High School Music Booster Association's website
Southern Athletics
AACPS webpage for Southern High School

Public high schools in Maryland
Schools in Anne Arundel County, Maryland
1968 establishments in Maryland
Educational institutions established in 1968